The 2006 NCAA Women's Gymnastics championship involved 12 schools competing for the national championship of women's NCAA Division I gymnastics.  It was the twenty fifth NCAA gymnastics national championship and the defending NCAA Team Champion for 2005 was Georgia.  The Competition took place in Corvallis, Oregon hosted by Oregon State University. The 2006 Championship was won by Georgia, their second in a row.

Champions

References
 http://www.gymnasticsresults.com
 http://www.gymn-forum.net/Results/ncaa-results.html

External links
 NCAA Gymnastics Championship Official site

NCAA Women's Gymnastics championship
2006 in women's gymnastics